Vasily Alekseyevich Degtyaryov (2 January 1880, Tula – 16 January 1949, Moscow) was a Soviet and Russian engineer who specialized in weapons design. He was awarded the title of Hero of Socialist Labour in 1940.

Biography

He was a factory worker at the Tula Arms Plant. He became married in 1905. Starting in 1918, Vasily Degtyaryov headed the first Soviet firearms design bureau at Kovrov Arms Factory.

In 1927, the Red Army was equipped with his 7.62 mm light machine gun DP-27. This design led to the development of the DT tank machine gun (1927) and two aircraft machine guns: DA and DA-2 (1928).

In 1940 he became a Doctor of Technical Sciences, and Hero of Socialist Labour (he received the second such award in its history just two weeks after Joseph Stalin). He joined the Communist Party of the Soviet Union in 1941.

During the Axis invasion of the USSR in summer 1941 he created the PTRD-41 14.5mm anti-tank rifle. In 1944 he became Major General of the Engineering and Artillery Service of the Soviet Union. He designed a belt-fed light machine gun, the RPD, chambered for the 7.62×39mm intermediate cartridge.

Vasily Degtyaryov was awarded the Stalin Prize in 1941, 1942, 1944, and 1949 (posthumously).

He was buried in a cemetery in Kovrov.

Inventions 
Degtyaryov developed a total 82 types of machine guns, submachine guns and anti-tank rifles, 19 of them were officially adopted.

Degtyaryov designed several models of submachine guns, the best of which would be adopted by the Soviet Army in 1934 (modernized in 1940) as the ППД PPD-40 (from Пистолет-пулемёт Дегтярёва, "Degtyaryov's submachine gun").
In 1930, Degtyaryov designed a 12.7 mm large-caliber machine gun, the ДК, or DK (Дегтярёва Крупнокалиберный, "Large-caliber Degtyaryov"). In 1938, this machine gun was upgraded by Georgy Shpagin and renamed ДШК (DShK) (Дегтярёва Шпагина Крупнокалиберный, "Large-caliber Shpagin-Degtyaryov").
In 1939, Degtyaryov designed his heavy machine gun called ДС, or DS (Дегтярёва Станковый "Heavy Degtyaryov"). The DS-39 was issued to the Red Army and used in the Winter War of 1939–1940. The belt feed mechanism damaged the cartridge cases and the gun was found too complicated and liable to malfunctions and was withdrawn from service.

Honours and awards
 Stalin Prizes;
1942 – 1st class and 2nd class
1946 – 2nd class
1949 – 1st class (posthumous)
 Hero of Socialist Labour (January 1940)
 Three Orders of Lenin (1933, 1940, 1944)
 Order of Suvorov, 1st class (September 1945)
 Order of Suvorov, 2nd class (November 1944)
 Order of the Red Banner of Labour
 Order of the Red Star
 Medal "For the Victory over Germany in the Great Patriotic War 1941–1945" (1945)

Commemoration

On the day of the designer’s death, by a resolution of the Council of Ministers of the USSR, monthly scholarships were established in his name:
 one is for graduate students (850 rubles) and one for is students (400 rubles) of the Leningrad Military Mechanical Institute;
 two are for post-graduate students (850 rubles) and two are for students (400 rubles) of the Tula Mechanical Institute;
 five are for excellent students (350 rubles) of the Kovrov College.
On October 17, 1954, a monument was erected in Kovrov for Degtyaryov, and a bust and several plaques were installed on the territory of the weapons factory bearing his name. At the memorial for gunsmiths and designers, a bas-relief was made in his likeness. A museum was opened in Degtyaryov's house on January 6, 1978. In addition, a technical school, a secondary school, a kindergarten, a recreation park, the House of Culture of Metal Workers and the former Komsomolskaya Street in Kovrov were named after him. A pioneer camp near the village of Sukhanikha was named after Degtyaryov. In many cities of the former USSR (Kharkiv, Novosibirsk, Lomonosov, Saint Petersburg) streets carry the name of Degtyaryov. On November 6, 1979, on the occasion of the centennial of the designer's birth, the USSR Ministry of Communications issued a postal envelope with his image. January 2, 1980 in Kovrov held a special cancellation of these envelopes. On August 18, 2004, the Russian Post also issued an envelope depicting Degtyaryov.

In popular culture
Degtyaryov appears in the 2020 Russian biographical film AK-47, played by Valery Barinov.

See also 
 Degtyaryov Plant
 RPD machine gun

References

Bibliography

Footnotes

1880 births
1949 deaths
People from Tula, Russia
People from Tulsky Uyezd
Communist Party of the Soviet Union members
First convocation members of the Soviet of the Union
Second convocation members of the Soviet of the Union
Soviet major generals
Russian engineers
Russian inventors
Soviet engineers
Firearm designers
20th-century Russian engineers
Heroes of Socialist Labour
Stalin Prize winners
Recipients of the Order of Lenin
Recipients of the Order of the Red Banner of Labour
Recipients of the Order of Suvorov, 1st class
Recipients of the Order of Suvorov, 2nd class
Recipients of the Order of the Red Star